The 1931 Cork Junior Hurling Championship was the 35th staging of the Cork Junior Hurling Championship since its establishment by the Cork County Board.

On 9 November 1931, Blackrock won the championship following a 3–07 to 1–01 defeat of Skibberreen in the final at Clonakilty Sportsfield. This was their fourth championship title overall and their first title since 1910.

References

Cork Junior Hurling Championship
Cork Junior Hurling Championship